The Canon EOS 80D is a digital single-lens reflex camera announced by Canon on February 18, 2016. It has the same body-only MSRP as the Canon EOS 70D, which it replaces. The camera can be purchased as a body-only, as kit with the 18-55mm IS STM lens, with the new 18-135mm IS USM lens or with the EF-S 18-200mm IS. As a part of the Canon EOS two-digit line, it is the successor to the EOS 70D and is the predecessor of the EOS 90D.

The camera is aimed at mid-market, semi-pro and enthusiast photographers.

New features from 70D 
Compared to the EOS 70D, several modifications were made, including:
 New 24.2-megapixel dual-pixel CMOS sensor
 45 cross-type AF points, compared to 19 for the 70D
 Of these points, 27 will support autofocus at 8 when the body is attached to one of two specific lens/teleconverter combinations (the Canon 100-400 Mark II with 1.4x III or the Canon 200-400 with 2x III). Any other lens/teleconverter combinations resulting in an aperture of 8 will only function with the center point. The 80D is the first non-professional EOS body that can autofocus in this situation; previous non-professional bodies could not autofocus if the maximum aperture of an attached lens/teleconverter combination was smaller than 5.6.
 DIGIC 6 (DIGIC 5+ on the 70D)
 New 7560-pixel RGB+IR metering sensor to aid the AF system
 New shutter mechanism to help reduce vibrations and camera shake
 "Anti-flicker" (introduced on EOS 7D Mk II) – shutter release can be set to compensate for flickering electric lighting
 100% scene coverage viewfinder
 Built-in NFC
 1080p at 60/50 fps video recording capability
 Built-in HDR and time-lapse recording capability (new software)
 Better low-light AF battery life, from 920 shots per battery to 960 shots per battery
 External 3.5 mm stereo headphone jack

References

External links

 
 dpreview: The Canon that can: Canon EOS 80D Review
 2016 Newest Generation 80D Reviewed
 Canon EOS 80D Review: Is still worth in 2020?

80D
Cameras introduced in 2016
Live-preview digital cameras